St. John's Wood is a London Underground station located in St John's Wood in the City of Westminster, north-west London. It was opened in 1939 as a stop on the Bakerloo line. Today St. John's Wood is served by the Jubilee line, between Swiss Cottage and Baker Street stations and is in Travelcard Zone 2. Essentially, St. John's Wood station is a local station with the nearby Metropolitan Line bypassing this station. A journey between St. John's Wood and Baker Street typically takes less than three minutes.

Location
The station building is located on the corner of Acacia Road and Finchley Road and tube maps from late 1938 and early 1939 indicate that it was originally to be given the name Acacia Road or Acacia. This station is the nearest to Lord's Cricket Ground and Abbey Road Studios. The station is therefore not to be confused with Abbey Road DLR station in east London.

History

The station was opened on 20 November 1939 on a new section of deep-level tunnel constructed between Baker Street and Finchley Road when the Metropolitan line's services on its Stanmore branch were transferred to the Bakerloo line. The new station replaced two nearby stations on the Metropolitan line which had closed the previous day. These were Lord's (originally named St. John's Wood Road, then St. John's Wood and, finally, Lord's) and Marlborough Road.

The station was transferred along with the rest of the Stanmore branch to the Jubilee line when it opened on 1 May 1979.

The station building designed by Stanley Heaps is Grade II listed.

The platform design remains the same as when opened in 1939, as designed by Harold Stabler. In 2006, the tiles were cleaned up and replaced.

Services
Train frequencies vary throughout the day, but generally operate every 2–5 minutes between 05:54 and 00:18 in both directions.

Connections
London Buses routes 13, 46, 113, 187 and night route N113 stop outside the station. Coach routes 712, 755, 757, 758, 768, 771, 772, 797 and A6 also serve the station. London Buses routes 139 and 189 serve Abbey Road.

In popular culture
The station appeared in the music video for "Bedsitter" by Soft Cell.

The recording of the underground train heard at the beginning and end of The Jam's 1978 song "Down in the Tube Station at Midnight" was recorded at St John's Wood. 

A common trivia question is, "Which London Underground station does not contain any of the letters in the word "mackerel"? The answer is St John's Wood, which does not contain any of the letters A-C-E-K-L-M-R. This is only true because the word "Saint" is always abbreviated "St" in the name, and because Hoxton is on the London Overground but not the Underground. Victoria Coren Mitchell described this as her favourite trivia question. Two former stations also fulfil the mackerel test: Wotton and Wood Siding, which were part of the Underground network between 1933 and 1935.

References

External links

London Transport Museum Photographic Archive

Jubilee line stations
London Underground Night Tube stations
Tube stations in the City of Westminster
Railway stations in Great Britain opened in 1939
Tube station